HNoMS Nasty was a fast attack craft of the Royal Norwegian Navy, built as a private venture by Westermoen Båtbyggeri of Mandal, Norway. Designed by Jan Herman Linge she was an experimental craft, of wooden hull construction, launched in 1958.
Nasty served with the Royal Norwegian Navy and was the prototype for the navies Tjeld class patrol boats. Boats to Nasty's design were also built for the US and German navies.
Nasty was stricken in 1967.

Notes

References
  Gardiner, Robert; Chumbley, Stephen Conway's All The World's Fighting Ships 1947–1995 (1995) Naval Institute Press, Annapolis 

Torpedo boats of the Royal Norwegian Navy
Motor torpedo boats of the Royal Norwegian Navy
Napier Deltic
1958 ships
Ships built in Mandal, Norway